"A Nice Place to Visit" is  episode 28 of the American television anthology series The Twilight Zone. The episode first aired on CBS on April 15, 1960. The title comes from the saying, "It's a nice place to visit, but I wouldn't want to live there."

In 1965, a slightly modified version of this story was broadcast on the radio program Theater Five. "The Land of Milk and Honey", episode number 154, retained all of the important aspects of this episode, including the innuendos and the surprise ending. On November 14, 1935, the radio program The Fleischmann's Yeast Hour hosted by Rudy Vallee broadcast a play titled The Other Place starring Colin Clive and Leo G. Carroll. It was written by John Balderston and dealt with a similar theme.

Opening narration

The narration continues after Rocky is shot by the cops.

Plot
After robbing a pawn shop, Henry Francis "Rocky" Valentine is shot in a gunfight by a police officer as he tries to flee. He wakes up to find himself seemingly unharmed by the encounter as a genial elderly man named Pip greets him. Pip explains that he has been instructed to guide Rocky and give him whatever he desires. Rocky becomes suspicious, thinking that Pip is trying to swindle him, but Pip proves to have detailed information on Rocky's tastes and hobbies. Rocky demands that Pip hand over his wallet; Pip says that he does not carry one, but gives Rocky $700 directly from his pocket and says that he can provide as much money as Rocky wants.

Thinking that Pip is trying to entice him to commit a crime, Rocky holds him at gunpoint as the two travel to a luxurious apartment. Pip explains that the apartment and everything in it are free, and Rocky starts to relax and changes into an expensive suit. However, his suspicions rise again when a meal is brought in, and he demands that Pip taste it first to prove that it is not poisoned. When Pip demurs, claiming he has forgotten how to eat after not doing so for centuries, Rocky shoots him several times but finds that his bullets have no effect. Rocky realizes that he is dead, and he concludes that he is in Heaven and Pip is his guardian angel. As Pip says he can have anything he wants, Rocky asks for $1 million and a beautiful woman and quickly has both requests fulfilled.

Rocky visits a casino with three women, winning every bet he makes as beautiful girls gather around him, and enjoys being able to torment a policeman after Pip shrinks him. Later, Rocky asks Pip if he can see some of his old friends who have also died, but Pip says that this world is for Rocky alone. Except for the two men, no one in it is real. When Rocky wonders what good deeds he could have done to gain entrance to Heaven, Pip takes him to visit the Hall of Records. Rocky looks through his own file and discovers that it only contains a list of his sins, but decides not to worry about it. Pip departs, saying that he can be reached by telephone as needed.

One month later, Rocky has become bored with having his whims instantly satisfied. He wins every game at the casino, and the women do anything he wants. He calls Pip and asks for a challenge in which he might run the risk of losing. Pip offers to arrange for him to lose once in a while at the casino, but Rocky dismisses the idea as he would know about the setup. Pip suggests robbing a bank, but Rocky quickly abandons that idea as well since a pre-planned outcome would take the thrill out of the crime. Deciding that he will go crazy if he stays in Heaven any longer, he asks Pip to take him to "the other place". feeling that he does not belong in Heaven. Pip retorts, "Heaven? Whatever gave you the idea you were in Heaven, Mr. Valentine? This is the other place!" 

Pip then laughs malevolently as he watches a now horrified Rocky unsuccessfully try to escape his "paradise".

Closing narration

Production notes
Mickey Rooney was the first choice to play Valentine. In a memo to Rod Serling, Charles Beaumont suggested, should Rooney not be available, that Serling consider playing the part. Serling declined and Rooney became unavailable. Rooney later guest starred in "The Last Night of a Jockey".

Guest star Cabot had to bleach his hair white for the role; it took three months for the actor's hair to return to its original dark color.

"A Nice Place to Visit" was singled out for its brazen sexual innuendo. Program Practices requested that Valentine not refer to a girl as "a broad [...] really stacked", even though the crudity was essential to establishing the unsavory qualities of the character. Nor could the protagonist refer to a party as "a ball" because that word had more than one meaning. In another sequence, a voluptuous young lady tends to Valentine's every need, then says "is there anything else I can do for you?" CBS's comment: "Please be certain that the girl's third speech be delivered in a sweet manner, as described."

Popular culture
The unreleased They Might Be Giants song "Hell Hotel" is based on "A Nice Place to Visit". According to producer Bill Krauss, the song references the episode's plot and lead actor Sebastian Cabot.

Donald Trump has said that this episode of The Twilight Zone inspired his philosophy of success, commenting, "I fight hard for victory, and I think I enjoy it as much as I ever did. But I realize that maybe new victories won't be the same as the first couple."

The plot of the 1979 pornographic film For the Love of Pleasure, starring Jamie Gillis and Annette Haven, is a broad rewrite of this episode.

References

Further reading
Zicree, Marc Scott: The Twilight Zone Companion. Sillman-James Press, 1982 (second edition)
DeVoe, Bill. (2008). Trivia from The Twilight Zone. Albany, GA: Bear Manor Media. 
Grams, Martin. (2008). The Twilight Zone: Unlocking the Door to a Television Classic. Churchville, MD: OTR Publishing.

External links

Twilight Zone trivia provided by tzone.

1960 American television episodes
Television episodes about the afterlife
Television episodes set in hell
Television shows written by Charles Beaumont
The Twilight Zone (1959 TV series season 1) episodes